"" is the national anthem of Sudan. The words were written by the poet Ahmed Mohammed Saleh and the tune was composed by Ahmed Morjan in 1955.

History
The current national anthem of Sudan was originally the organizational anthem of the Sudan Defence Force prior to independence. The poem "We are the Soldiers of God, the Soldiers of Homeland" was chosen among other poems that participated in a general competition about poetic works praising the strength of the Sudan Defence Force in 1955. When Sudan gained independence in 1956, the first four verses of the poem were chosen to be the national anthem.

Lyrics

Tune

Notes

References

External links
Sudan: Nahnu Jund Allah Jund Al-watan - Audio of the national anthem of Sudan, with information and lyrics (archived)
National anthem of Sudan - Instrumental

African anthems
Sudanese music
National symbols of Sudan
National anthem compositions in E-flat major